Gravois Park is a historic neighborhood of St. Louis, Missouri.  Roughly bounded by Jefferson Avenue, Chippewa Street, Grand Boulevard, and Cherokee Street, the Gravois Park neighborhood is a diverse mix of homeowners, renters, and businesses. The area's architecture reflects its settlement at the turn of the 20th century. The namesake park dates from 1812 (a grant made by the US government), and was praised for its beauty in the nineteenth century already, and in 1914 was part of a walking tour of the city meant to show off the City Plan Commission's "idealized view of the shape of the city."

Demographics

In 2020 the Gravois Park's racial makeup was 60.7% Black, 20.6% White, 0.5% Native American, 2.7% Asian, 8.0% Two Or More Races, and 7.5% Some Other Race. 10.9% of the population was of Hispanic or Latino origin.

As of the 2010 census, Gravois Park is the densest neighborhood in the city of St. Louis at 11,929 residents per square mile

See also
 Dutchtown, the German-American settled neighborhood to the south of Gravois Park

References

Neighborhoods in St. Louis